Barry Adamson (born 11 June 1958) is an English pop and rock musician, composer, writer, photographer and filmmaker. He came to prominence in the late 1970s as a member of the post-punk band Magazine and went on to work with Visage, The Birthday Party, Nick Cave and the Bad Seeds, and the electro musicians Pan Sonic. In addition to prolific solo work, Adamson has also remixed Grinderman, The Jon Spencer Blues Explosion, Recoil and Depeche Mode. He also worked on the soundtrack for David Lynch's surrealistic crime film Lost Highway.

Biography

Early life
Adamson was born in Moss Side, Manchester, England to a white mother and a black father. He read comic books from an early age. At school he immersed himself in art, music and film and produced his first song - "Brain Pain" - at the age of 10. His diverse musical tastes range from Alice Cooper to Motown to David Bowie.

Career
After leaving school, Adamson drifted into graphic design whilst attending Stockport Art College but quit shortly after, preferring to venture into the exploding punk rock scene of the late 1970s. He joined ex-Buzzcocks singer Howard Devoto's band Magazine to play the bass guitar, with whom he scored one chart single, "Shot by Both Sides"; in late 1977, he also joined the Buzzcocks, as a temporary replacement for Garth Smith. He played on all of Magazine's albums in their original incarnation and contributed to Devoto's solo album and his next band, Luxuria. He also contributed to the studio-based band Visage, playing on the ensemble's first two albums, Visage and The Anvil.

After Magazine broke up, Adamson worked with another ex-Buzzcock, Pete Shelley, before joining Nick Cave and the Bad Seeds, featuring on four of their albums: From Her to Eternity, The Firstborn Is Dead, Kicking Against the Pricks and Your Funeral, My Trial. After his stint with the band and a European tour with Iggy Pop in 1987, he went solo, releasing an EP, The Man with the Golden Arm in 1988, and his first solo album, Moss Side Story, the following year, the "soundtrack" to a non-existent film noir. The album incorporated newscasts and sampled sound effects and featured guest musicians Marcia Schofield (of The Fall), Diamanda Galas, and former colleagues from the Bad Seeds. Adamson's second solo album was the soundtrack to a real film this time – Carl Colpaert's Delusion, and he would go on to provide soundtracks for several other films.

Adamson's third album, Soul Murder, was shortlisted for the Mercury Music Prize in 1992.

His solo work has mostly been influenced by John Barry, Elmer Bernstein and Ennio Morricone, whilst his later works include jazz, electronica, soul, funk, and dub-styles.

In 1996, Adamson contributed to the AIDS-Benefit Album, Offbeat: A Red Hot Soundtrip, produced by the Red Hot Organization. His own album that year, Oedipus Schmoedipus, reached #51 in the UK Albums Chart. It would later be included in the 1001 Albums You Must Hear Before You Die list, along with Moss Side Story.

In 2002, Adamson left his long-term label, Mute Records, and started his own production home, Central Control International. In 2006, he released Stranger on the Sofa, first for his Central Control International imprint, to critical acclaim. Back to the Cat, his second album for the label, was released in March 2008.

In 2007 it was announced that Magazine would re-form for concerts in 2008. Adamson took part in the same band line-up that recorded Secondhand Daylight, with the exception of the late John McGeoch, who was replaced by Apollo 440 member Noko. However, Adamson has since withdrawn from the reunion and new recordings.

On 27 August 2010, Adamson released the track "Rag and Bone", as a digital download and as a 12-inch vinyl record.

In 2011, Adamson premiered his directorial debut, Therapist, for which he also provided the music. He then released a studio album, I Will Set You Free, on 30 January 2012.

Adamson collaborated with the Bad Seeds on their 2013 album, Push the Sky Away, playing bass guitar on two songs. He also toured with the band on drums and keyboards, to fill in for an ailing Thomas Wydler.

His 2016 album Know Where To Run was accompanied by a book with photos that Adamson shot in the US while on tour with Nick Cave. 2018 saw the release of Memento Mori, an album celebrating his 40th anniversary as a professional musician, which was followed by a concert at the Union Chapel in London. A recording of this concert was released on vinyl and CD.

Soundtrack material
Adamson's "Refugee Song" was included in Derek Jarman's The Last of England soundtrack. He composed the soundtrack to Delusion, which has also been released. Adamson also contributed soundtrack material to Gas Food Lodging and David Lynch's Lost Highway.

Instruments
In the earliest Real Life Magazine videos, Adamson played a Rickenbacker 4001, and on Secondhand Daylight, a Gibson EB-3. His primary bass during Magazine's touring was an Ovation Magnum 2. The Ovation can be seen in Magazine's appearance in Urgh! A Music War as well as on the cover of the live album Play. For the 2008 Magazine concerts, he alternated between the Ovation, a Fender Artist and a Fender Jaguar Bass. He often used a Boss Chorus unit on his basses, giving a slightly processed sound that was much imitated in the UK 1980s rock scene.

Legacy
In his autobiography, It's So Easy (And Other Lies), Duff McKagan of Guns N' Roses said he was influenced by bass-driven bands such as that of Barry Adamson in Magazine. In an interview with German music magazine Gitarre & Bass, Billy Gould of Faith No More said that Adamson was one of his influences, because he combined soul music with post-punk when he played with Magazine.

Discography

Studio albums

Compilation albums

EPs

Singles

Soundtracks

Albums

Contributions

Compositions 

 To Have and to Hold (1996) film score with Nick Cave & Mick Harvey

 The World of Interiors (2001) film score

References

External links
 
 Adamson's art-house
 

1958 births
Living people
People from Moss Side
20th-century Black British male singers
English people of Scottish descent
Buzzcocks members
English rock bass guitarists
Male bass guitarists
English film score composers
English male film score composers
English rock singers
British post-punk musicians
Magazine (band) members
Musicians from Manchester
Nick Cave and the Bad Seeds members
Mute Records artists
21st-century Black British male singers
Visage (band) members